SKPC may refer to:
Germán Olano Airport or Puerto Carreño Airport, Vichada department, Colombia
Provincial Court of Saskatchewan